The 1996 NBA All-Star Game was the 46th edition of the NBA All-Star Game, an exhibition basketball game played on February 11, 1996. The event was held at the Alamodome in San Antonio and was a part of the 50th season of the NBA. The game was televised nationally by NBC in the United States and by CTV in Canada. There were 36,037 people in attendance. Michael Jordan put on a show for the fans in his first game back from retirement and ended up receiving the game's most valuable player award.

Ballots

Phil Jackson from the Chicago Bulls coached the Eastern Conference and George Karl from the Seattle SuperSonics coached the Western Conference. The rosters for the All-Star game were chosen via a fan ballot. The fans would vote for every position, as well as the coaches, and the players that received the most votes would be placed on a team. If a player were unable to participate due to an injury, then the commissioner would select another player as a replacement. Grant Hill led the all-star voting with 1,358,004 votes with Michael Jordan being right behind him with 1,341,422 votes. The rest of the Eastern conference starters were Penny Hardaway, Scottie Pippen and Shaquille O’Neal. The reserves included Patrick Ewing, Reggie Miller, Vin Baker and Terrell Brandon. For the West, the person that led the all-star voting was Charles Barkley with 1,268,195 votes. Clyde Drexler, after seven appearances with Portland Trail Blazers, appeared in the game for the first time as a Houston Rocket. The rest of the Western starters were Jason Kidd, Shawn Kemp, and Hakeem Olajuwon. The reserves included David Robinson, Gary Payton, Sean Elliott, and Karl Malone.

All-Star Game

Box Score

This game was the first All-Star game that Michael Jordan played in after returning from his first retirement. He scored 20 points, 4 rebounds and 1 assist shooting at about a 73% average for the game. Shaquille O’Neal, scored 25 points with 10 rebounds to lead the East in scoring and rebounds. For the West on the other hand, Jason Kidd was the assist leader with 10 assists in his first All-Star Game appearance. The scoring leaders for the West were David Robinson and Gary Payton with both players contributing 18 points respectively. The East won the game with a score of 129-118. Although there was a great deal of controversy with fans saying that Shaquille O’Neal deserved the award, Michael Jordan ended up receiving the All-Star game's Most Valuable Player.

Roster

References

Events in San Antonio
National Basketball Association All-Star Game
All-Star
Basketball in San Antonio
Sports competitions in Texas